Max Korus (born October 5, 1988) is an American professional racing cyclist. He rode in the men's team time trial at the 2015 UCI Road World Championships.

References

External links
 

1988 births
Living people
American male cyclists
People from Montgomery County, Pennsylvania
Sportspeople from Pennsylvania